The Des Aulnes River (English: Alders River) is a tributary of the west bank of the Laflamme river, flowing in the municipality of Barraute, in the regional county municipality (MRC) of Abitibi, in the administrative region of Abitibi-Témiscamingue, Quebec, Canada. His course is entirely in Barraute Township.

The "Des Aulnes River" flows in forest and agricultural areas. Forestry is the main economic activity of this hydrographic slope; agriculture, second.

The surface of the river is usually frozen from mid-November to mid-April, however safe ice circulation is generally from mid-December to late March.

Geography 
The hydrographic slopes adjacent to the "Des Aulnes River" are:
North side: Laflamme River, Fisher Creek;
East side: Laflamme River, Frenette Creek, Castor Creek;
South side: Barraute Creek, Lafrance Stream, Laflamme River, Fiedmont Lake, Fiedmont River;
West side: Landrienne River, Angers Brook, La Motte Lake, Harricana River.

The "Des Aulnes River" has its source of streams draining a marsh area, located in Barraute Township. This wetland constitutes the plateau of several hydrographic slopes, including that of Fischer Creek (tributary of the Laflamme River on the north side) and of Barraute Creek (tributary of the Laflamme River on the south side).

This source of the "Des Aulnes River" is located at:
 west of the railway bridge over the Laflamme River to the village of Barraute, Quebec;
 Northwest of the mouth of the "Des Aulnes River";
 Northeast of Lake La Motte;
 Northwest of Fiedmont Lake.

From its source, the course of the "Des Aulnes River" flows over  according to the following segments:
 Southeast, crossing a marsh zone at the beginning of the segment, up to the Picard stream (coming from the South);
 Northeast, in agricultural zone, to Marcotte Creek (coming from the North);
 to the Southeast in a mainly forest and agricultural zone, passing south of the village of Barraute, Quebec, to its confluence.

The "Des Aulnes River" empties on the west bank of the Laflamme River at:
 North of the mouth of Fiedmont Lake;
 Northeast of Malartic Lake;
 South of the village center of Barraute;
 West of the railway bridge over the Bell River to Senneterre, Quebec;
 South of the mouth of the Laflamme River (confluence with the Bell River).

Toponymy 
The toponym "Des Aulnes River" was formalized on November 5, 1981 at the Commission de toponymie du Québec.

See also 
James Bay
Rupert Bay
Nottaway River
Lake Matagami
Bell River
Laflamme River
Abitibi, a regional county municipality (MRC)
Barraute, Quebec, a municipality
List of rivers of Quebec

References

External links 

Rivers of Abitibi-Témiscamingue